John Thomas McIntosh (26 September 1878 – 24 June 1944) was an Australian rules footballer who played with Melbourne in the Victorian Football League (VFL).

Notes

External links 
		
 

1878 births
1944 deaths
Australian rules footballers from Victoria (Australia)
Melbourne Football Club players